Caladenia procera, commonly known as the Carbunup king spider orchid, is a species of orchid endemic to the south-west of Western Australia. It has a single erect, hairy leaf and up to four greenish-yellow and red flowers. It is one of the tallest and has amongst the largest flowers of  the spider orchids.

Description
Caladenia procera is a terrestrial, perennial, deciduous, herb with an underground tuber and which occurs as single plants or in small clumps. Flowering occurs from September to October.<ref name="irp">{{cite web|title=Carbunup king spider orchid (Caladenia procera") recovery plan|url=https://www.environment.gov.au/system/files/resources/054a081e-8cc0-4548-867a-b1d6d8b44b2a/files/caladenia-procera.pdf|publisher=Australian Government Department of the Environment|accessdate=7 March 2017}}</ref>

Taxonomy and namingCaladenia procera was first described in 2001 by Stephen Hopper and Andrew Phillip Brown from a specimen collected near Carbunup River and the description was published in Nuytsia. The specific epithet (procera) is a Latin word meaning "tall", "slender" or "long" referring to the tall flowering stem of this orchid.

Distribution and habitat
The Carbunup king spider orchid is found in a few locations south-west of Busselton in the Swan Coastal Plain biogeographic region where it grows in jarrah, marri and peppermint woodland.

ConservationCaladenia procera is classified as "Threatened Flora (Declared Rare Flora — Extant)" by the Western Australian Government Department of Parks and Wildlife and is listed as "Critically Endangered" under the Australian government Environment Protection and Biodiversity Conservation Act 1999''. The main threats to the species are land clearing, road and firebreak maintenance and inappropriate fire regimes.

References

procera
Endemic orchids of Australia
Orchids of Western Australia
Plants described in 2001
Endemic flora of Western Australia
Taxa named by Stephen Hopper
Taxa named by Andrew Phillip Brown